Ronald Radford may refer to:
 Ronald Radford (guitarist), American guitar player
 Ronald Radford (civil servant) (1916–1995), English civil servant
 Ron Radford (born 1949), Australian curator
 Ronnie Radford (1943–2022), English footballer